This is a list of ambassadors of the United States to Morocco. Morocco was the first country to recognize the United States of America in 1777. Regular diplomatic relations were established in 1905. In 1912 Morocco came under the control of France and Spain as protectorates. The United States did not initially recognize the French and Spanish protectorates over Morocco. However, in 1917 upon U.S. entry into the First World War, the U.S. government recognized the protectorates. The U.S. Minister at Tangier was downgraded to the status of Diplomatic Agent. In 1956 the U. S. recognized Morocco’s independence, established an embassy in Rabat, and appointed a ranking ambassador, Cavendish W. Cannon.

Heads of the U.S. Legation at Tangier (1906–1917)

Heads of the U.S. Consulate General at Tangier (1917–1933)

Heads of the U.S. Legation at Tangier (1933–1956)

Heads of the U.S. Embassy at Rabat (1956–present)

See also
Morocco – United States relations
Foreign relations of Morocco
Ambassadors of the United States

References

United States Department of State: Background notes on Morocco

External links
 United States Department of State: Chiefs of Mission for Morocco
 United States Department of State: Morocco
 United States Embassy in Rabat

Main
Morocco
United States